Hof Prison was a prison in Hof in Vestfold og Telemark, Norway.

It had a capacity of 105 prisoners, serving sentences of up to one year. It was closed in 2019.

External links
Hof Prison
Closed in 2019

Buildings and structures in Vestfold og Telemark
Prisons in Norway
Year of establishment missing